The Rambler Rebel is an automobile that was produced by the American Motors Corporation (AMC) of Kenosha, Wisconsin for the 1957–1960 model years, as well as again for 1966 and 1967.

Introduced as a stand-alone model in one body style, the 1957 Rambler Rebel is credited for being the first factory-produced intermediate-sized high-performance car. This later became known as the muscle car market segment. It was also to be among the earliest production cars equipped with electronic fuel injection.

The second and third generations essentially became the equivalent Rambler Six models, but equipped with a V8 engine. The Rebel nameplate was reintroduced in 1966 as the top-line intermediate-sized two-door hardtop. For the 1967 model year, AMC's all-new intermediate line took the Rebel name. American Motors dropped the historic "Rambler" marque from these intermediate-sized models to become the AMC Rebel starting with the 1968 model year.

Both the Rambler Six and Rambler Rebel V8 were assembled at the former-Nash Motors plant in Toronto Canada until July 1957 when the Toronto plant closed. Canadian-market Ramblers were then imported from Kenosha until AMC opened its new assembly plant in Brampton, Ontario in December 1960. The cars were also produced in Argentina by Industrias Kaiser Argentina (IKA).

History 
The strategy of American Motors President, George W. Romney, was to avoid a head-to-head battle with the domestic Big Three automakers (General Motors, Ford, and Chrysler) by focusing AMC on cars that were smaller than the "standard" models in the marketplace. The "legacy" large-sized Nash and Hudson models were suffering from dwindling sales in a marketplace where consumers were only offered large-sized sedans and small economy cars. The new Rambler was designed "to split the market wide open with a mid-size model that featured aggressive styling and plenty of power."

Development of AMC's new overhead-valve V8 engine began in 1955, under the automaker's chief engineer, Meade Moore, as well as David Potter who was hired from Kaiser-Frazer. The new engine evolved because component sharing relationships with Packard were terminated and AMC managers decided to manufacture a V8 engine in-house.

The new engine debuted in mid-1956 in the Nash Ambassador Special and the Hudson Hornet Special. At that time, the  engine was the smallest American V8, but its  was more than either of Chevrolet's contemporary two-barrel V8s.

The 1956 model year four-door Rambler models were completely redesigned. Edmund E. Anderson and Bill Reddig styled the new model with a "dramatic reverse-sloped C-pillar" as well as borrowing the Nash-Healey's Pinin Farina-designed inboard, grille-mounted headlamps.

For the 1957 model year the Rambler was established as a separate marque. The 1957 Rambler Rebel debuted as a special model in the Rambler line showcasing AMC's big new V8 engine. The Rebel became the first factory-produced lightweight muscle car.

First generation

1957 

American Motors surprised most observers with the December 1956 introduction of the Rambler Rebel – "a veritable supercar". The new 1957 model debuted as a high-performance vehicle that combined AMC's lightweight  wheelbase Rambler four-door hardtop body with AMC's newly introduced  V8 engine. This made it the first-time that a large block V8 was installed in a mid-size car in the post-World War II marketplace. General Motors, Ford, and Chrysler offered no intermediate-sized cars whatsoever.

Although AMC was best known for their reliable economy cars, this special model came with a bigger engine than anything found at Chevrolet, Ford, or Plymouth—the Rambler's most popular competitors at that time. The Rebel's US$2,786 MSRP base price ($ in  dollars ) was economical for the amount of power provided. It was the fastest stock American sedan, according to Motor Trend.

All Rebels came with a manual (with overdrive unit) or GM's four-speed Hydra-Matic automatic transmission, as well as other performance enhancements such as a dual exhaust system, heavy-duty suspension with Gabriel (brand) shock absorbers, and front sway bar. The Rebel was capable of 0 to 60 mph (0-97  km/h) acceleration in just 7.5 seconds with its standard  carbureted engine. The car's light monocoque (unibody) construction afforded a power-to-weight ratio of about 13 pounds per horsepower, a better ratio than other 1957 model year automobiles and a contrast to Volkswagen's 45.

The Rebel's engine also differed from the 327s installed in the 1957 Ambassador and Hudson Hornet models because it used mechanical valve lifters and a higher compression ratio. Since both engines were rated at 255 hp, it is probable that the Rebel's was underrated.

Power steering and power drum brakes were also standard, as on all Rambler Custom models. The car was available only in silver metallic paint accented with gold anodized aluminum inserts along the sides. Padded dashboards and visors, rear child proof door locks, and seat belts were all optional. A total of 1,500 Rebels were produced in 1957. Integrated air conditioning system, the All Weather Eye was a $345 option.

The Rebel is considered to be a precursor of the muscle cars (rear-wheel drive mid-size cars with powerful V8 engines and special trims) that became so popular in the 1960s. It also foretold that muscle-type performance would be included among AMC's models.

Fuel injection option 
The Bendix Electrojector electronic manifold injection (EFI) was to be optional on the 1957 Rambler Rebel with a flashy introduction at the Daytona Beach Road Course trials. This was to have been the first mass-produced engine with a transistorized "brain box" fuel injection system. A Rambler Rebel with the optional EFI was tested by Motor Trend, and they recorded this sedan going faster from a standing start than the 1957 Chevrolet Corvette with mechanical fuel injection.

The Bendix system's public debut in December 1956 was followed by a March 1957 price bulletin listing it as a US$395 option, but because of supplier difficulties, EFI Rebels would only be available after June 15. This was to have been the first production EFI engine, but Electrojector's teething problems meant only pre-production cars were so equipped: thus, very few cars so equipped were ever sold, and none were made available to the public. The Rambler's EFI was more advanced than the mechanical types then appearing on the market and the engines ran fine in warm weather, but suffered hard starting in cooler temperatures. As a result, all of the production Rebels used a four-barrel carburetor. Nevertheless, the EFI option remained in the published owner's manual.

Second generation

1958 
For the 1958 model year, the Rebel name returned, but no longer with the 327 engine. Rather than identifying a specialty model, the name was applied to all Ramblers powered by AMC's  V8 engine. The 327 engine was made standard in the more luxurious Rambler Ambassador models. The 1958 Rebel lineup encompassed six models: Super or Custom trimmed four-door sedans and Cross Country station wagons, plus a base Deluxe four-door sedan that was reserved for fleet sales. A four-door hardtop in the top-line Custom trim was now Rebel's sole pillarless model.

These Rebels were no longer the muscle car of 1957, but did offer more power than regular Rambler models. A test by Motor Trend concluded "the V8 powered Rebel is now able to reach a true 60-mph from a standstill in an estimated 12.0 seconds"—significantly slower than the limited-production '57 Rebel, and this was pretty good for that era.

The 1958 Rambler Rebel and Rambler Six shared revised styling with a new grille, front fenders containing quad headlamps, as well as a new hood design while the rear received new fenders with impressive tailfins.

1959 
Car Life magazine called the 1959 Rambler "one of the most attractive cars on the road".

All Rambler Rebels benefitted from bigger brakes, improved automatic transmission controls, and numerically lower axle ratios for improved fuel economy. A new option was adjustable headrests.

Third generation

1960 
American Motors downplayed the Rambler Rebel name in 1960. Rather than focus on the separate Six and Rebel models, as in previous years, the emphasis was placed on the Rambler name and the trim levels, with the notation that each series was offered with "Economy 6" or "Rebel V8" engines.

The Rambler Rebel was all new, but retained the same styling concept. The front end featured a full-width die-cast grille, while the two-piece front and rear bumpers were promoted to cut repair costs. The C-pillars were made narrower and the tail fins were now smaller.

Station wagons with two rows of seats came with a conventional tailgate (roll down rear window and drop down gate) while three-row models received a new side-hinged door. All station wagons included a standard roof rack. Among the 17 different station wagons that were marketed by AMC for 1960, the Rambler Six Cross Country Super was the most popular.

After the 1960 model year all of the  wheelbase models took the Rambler Classic name.

Fourth generation

1966 
The Rebel name reappeared for the 1966 model year on a version of the Rambler Classic two-door hardtop.

This model featured bucket seats, special interior and exterior trim, as well as a revised roofline. The base price of this top-of-the-line model was US$2,523 with the standard  I6; however, more sports oriented options were available that included a new-for-1966 Borg-Warner T-10 four-speed manual floor-mounted transmission, dash mounted tachometer, as well as the  V8 producing , which was only an extra $65.

This effort moved AMC once again toward the muscle car market segment; however the Rebel was criticized for its antiquated torque tube suspension system. The Rebel also suffered from Rambler's "economy" reputation, but the Rebel model offered the recipe common to most of early muscle cars including the biggest-available engine, bucket seats, and special trim, but the Rebel did not have a non-functional hood scoop.

Total production of the Rebel model was 7,512. The 1966 Rambler Rebel "poses a great bargain for the muscle-car enthusiast [today] ... rarity and performance wrapped up into a single cost-efficient package.

Fifth generation

1967 
For the 1967 model year, all of AMC's intermediates took the Rambler Rebel name. As part of his plan since 1965 to shed AMC of its "economy car" image, CEO Roy Abernethy ordered a completely new design from the predecessor models. Abernethy's objective was to position the 1967 Rebel and Ambassador designs on an equal basis with competitive models marketed by the Big Three's Economy Brands.

The new Rebels were bigger and rode on a longer  wheelbase allowing for more passenger space and cargo capacity. The new styling featured sweeping rooflines with more glass area, as well as a smooth, rounded "coke-bottle" body design.

The Rebel was now available not only in 4-door sedan, 4-door station wagon, and 2-door hardtop versions, but also for 1967 as 2-door sedan (coupé) with a thin B-pillar and flip out rear side windows, as well as a convertible. The new coupe was only available in the lowest trim level, but was design was marketed a "Sports Sedan" as it identical in style to the hardtop including frameless door windows. The convertible body style included a power-operated top that featured an all-new "fastback" profile with a "split stack" folding roof mechanism with concealed side rails that did not intrude into the backseat area, thus offering room for three adult passengers in the rear. The station wagons now had featured a new second-row seat mechanism folding it down and forward to offer  of flat-floored cargo space with the tailgate opening also made wider and taller than the 1966 versions. The Rebel models were similar to the senior Ambassador in that they shared the same basic unit-body (platform) aft of the cowl. Rebels came in the base 550 and deluxe 770 models, with a high-line SST available only as a two-door hardtop.

Traditional Rambler economy came standard with the redesigned Rebels featuring six-cylinder engines and overdrive transmissions. However, the Rebels were upgraded in numerous areas including a new four-link, trailing-arm rear suspension system. American Motors also introduced advanced V8 engines, and Rebels could now be turned "into a decent budget-priced muscle car" with the new .

Moreover, American Motors expanded its racing activities in 1967 by partnering with automotive performance parts company, Grant Industries, to build the Grant Rambler Rebel, a "Funny Car" racer to compete in the National Hot Rod Association (NHRA) X/S (Experimental Stock) and Super Experimental Stock classes. The relationship provided both companies with national exposure and publicity. The engine featured a GMC 6-71 blower and Enderle fuel injection, producing  at up to 9000 rpm on a mixture of alcohol and nitromethane.

1968 

For the 1968 model year, the historic "Rambler" marque was dropped and the line was named AMC Rebel. The cars received only a modest restyle, but incorporated new safety features mandated by the U.S. National Highway Traffic Safety Administration (NHTSA), engine control systems to reduce unburned hydrocarbon and carbon monoxide emissions, and the availability of the "AMX"   V8 engine.

Declining sales of convertibles in general during the late 1960s saw discontinuance of this body style by AMC after only 823 were built in 1968.

Production of Rebels continued through the 1970 model year until replaced by the similar AMC Matador for the 1971 model year.

Production

Fifth generation Rebels were built at AMC's main assembly plant in Kenosha, Wisconsin and in its Canadian Brampton Assembly in Brampton, Ontario.

Foreign assembly from Semi Knock Down (SKD) kits was undertaken by Australian Motor Industries in Australia and by Campbell Motor Industries in Thames, New Zealand and from Complete Knock Down (CKD) kits by Renault in Europe (for the 1967 model only) and by Vehiculos Automotores Mexicanos in Mexico. Export markers retained the Rambler marque for the entire run of Rebels as well as for the replacement Matador.

See also 
 Rambler Six—the companion 1957–1960 models with I6 engines
 AMC Rebel—the successor 1967–1970 models

Notes

Resources

External links 

 AMC Rambler Car Club
 The American Motors Owners Association
 The Nash Car Club
 Ramblers History on amcrc.com
 AMCyclopedia AMC/Rambler History/Documentation Site
 

Rebel
AMC vehicles
Cars introduced in 1957
1960s cars
Mid-size cars
Sedans
Station wagons
Muscle cars
Rear-wheel-drive vehicles